is a Japanese weightlifter. He competed in the men's 62 kg event at the 2016 Summer Olympics. He finished in 4th place.

References

External links
 

1991 births
Living people
Japanese male weightlifters
Olympic weightlifters of Japan
Weightlifters at the 2016 Summer Olympics
Place of birth missing (living people)
Weightlifters at the 2014 Asian Games
Weightlifters at the 2018 Asian Games
Universiade medalists in weightlifting
World Weightlifting Championships medalists
Universiade silver medalists for Japan
Asian Games competitors for Japan
Medalists at the 2013 Summer Universiade
Weightlifters at the 2020 Summer Olympics
21st-century Japanese people